Park Seong-won or Pak Song-won may refer to:
 Park Seongwon (writer) (born 1969)
 Park Seong-won (swimmer) (born 1972)

See also
 Park (Korean surname), for other people with the same family name
 Sung-won, for other people with the same given name